The Ministry of Foreign Affairs is the Kyrgyz government ministry which oversees the foreign relations of Kyrgyzstan.

Departments 
The following 11 are departments in the Ministry of Foreign Affairs:

 Commonwealth of Independent States Department
 Western Department 
 Eastern Department
 Department for International Organizations
 Department of Economic co-operation
 Consular Service
 Legal Department 
 Financial Department 
 Help Department
 Protocol Department 
 Frontier Department

Diplomatic Academy 
The Kazy Dikambayev Diplomatic Academy of the Ministry of Foreign Affairs of Kyrgyzstan (Russian: Дипломатической академии Министерства иностранных дел Кыргызской Республики им. К. Дикамбаева) is the main instructional institution of the ministry which is used to train future diplomats of Kyrgyzstan. Founded in 2001, the academy is officially accredited and recognized by the Ministry of Education and Science of Kyrgyzstan as a public coeducational institution. It is located on 36 Prospect Erkindik in the capital city of Bishkek.

The academy is currently partnered with the following organizations:

 Diplomatic Academy of the Ministry of Foreign Affairs of the Russian Federation
 MGIMO University
 Xinjiang University
 Confucius Institute
 Lanzhou University
 Friedrich Ebert Foundation
 Konrad Adenauer Foundation
 Diplomatic Academy of Vienna

List of Ministers

Kyrgyz SSR 
 1944-1949: Kazy Dikambayev
 1949-1953:  Shamshy Tayanov
 1953-1963: Kuluipa Konduchalova
 1963-1980: Sakin Begmatova
 1980-1986: Dzhamal Tashibekova
 1986-1989: Roza Otunbayeva
 1989-1991: Zhanyl Tumenbayeva

Kyrgyz Republic 
 1991-1992: Muratbek Imanaliyev
 1992: Roza Otunbayeva
 1992: Marat Saralinov (acting)
 1992-1993: Ednan Karabayev
 1993-1994: Myrza Kaparov (acting)                        
 1994-1997: Roza Otunbayeva
 1997-2002: Muratbek Imanaliyev
 2002-2005: Askar Aitmatov                  
 2005: Roza Otunbayeva
 2005-2007: Alikbek Jekshenkulov      
 2007-2009: Ednan Karabayev
 2009-2010: Kadyrbek Sarbayev
 2010-2012: Ruslan Kazakbayev
 2012-2018: Erlan Abdyldayev
 2018–2020: Chingiz Aidarbekov
 2020–2022: Ruslan Kazakbayev
 2022–present: Jeenbek Kulubaev

References

External links 
  Ministry of Foreign Affairs of Kyrgyzstan
 Diplomatic Academy

Foreign Affairs
Foreign relations of Kyrgyzstan
Kyrgyzstan
Government of Kyrgyzstan